Aodán Mac Póilin (1948 – 29 December 2016) was an Irish language activist in Northern Ireland.

Background
Aodán Mac Póilin was born in Belfast and grew up in Norfolk Road in the Andersonstown area. His father worked as a civil servant and his mother was an Irish language speaker. He had two sisters.  He attended the New University of Ulster in the 1970s and obtained a BA (Hons) and an M.Phil. in Irish studies. He helped to establish the Shaw's Road Irish-speaking community where he and his wife Áine lived.

Career
After graduation, Mac Póilin was a teacher for a period and then became Director of the ULTACH Trust in 1990.

He was active in the European Bureau for Lesser-Used Languages and the Community Relations Council for Northern Ireland, and was chairman of the first Irish-medium school in Northern Ireland.

Mac Póilin served on the board of Northern Ireland Screen for 5 years from 2012, with particular responsibility for the Irish Language Broadcast Fund. He also served on the boards of the Columba Initiative, Comhairle na Gaelscolaíochta (the Council for Irish-medium Education), the Education Broadcasting Council of BBC Northern Ireland, Foras na Gaeilge (the cross-border Irish language implementation body), and the Seamus Heaney Centre for Poetry, Queen's University Belfast.

Mac Póilin wrote and lectured extensively on various aspects of the Irish language, literature and culture.  He made a major contribution to the revitalisation of the Irish language in Northern Ireland.

Mac Póilin died on 29 December 2016.

Books
 Styles of Belonging: the cultural identities of Ulster (1992) (editor)
 Ruined Pages, New Selected Poems of Padraic Fiacc (1994) (co-editor with Gerald Dawe)
 The Irish Language in Northern Ireland (1997)
 The Great Book of Gaelic (2002) (member of the editorial panel)
Our Tangled Speech, Essays on Language and Culture  (2018).

References

20th-century Irish people
21st-century Irish people
Schoolteachers from Belfast
Alumni of Ulster University
Irish language activists
1948 births
2016 deaths